= Alexander Devyatov =

Australian boxer (born 1998)

Aleksandr Deviatov
Personal information
- Born: Александр Владимирович Девятов Saratov, Russia
- Height: 5 ft 8 in (1.73 m)
- Weight: Lightweight

Boxing career
- Stance: Orthodox

Boxing record
- Total fights: 16
- Wins: 16
- Win by KO: 14
- Losses: 0

Aleksandr Deviatov is a Russian born, Australian professional boxer. He currently competes in the lightweight division.

== Professional career ==
=== Deviatov vs Settaphon ===
Deviatov faced Thai Krai Setthaphon in Kaliningrad. Setthaphon was in survival mode the whole fight and in between the fifth and sixth round he quit in his corner after his output decreased and the punishment he was taking was increasing each round.

=== Deviatov vs Lazaro ===
Deviatov claimed the first title of his pro career when he stopped Tanzanian Adam Lazaro in Moscow to win the vacant WBA Asian 135lb title. In what was slugfest it didnt last long. Deviatov dropped Lazaro early in the first round. Lazaro got back up but the referee stepped in after another attack from Deviatov

=== Deviatov vs Kumar ===
Deviatov picked up another belt after he beat Indian Karthik Sathish Kumar in Bundall, Australia. Despite Deviatov going the distance for just the second time in his career he won comfortably on the cards. With the win Deviatov won the vacant WBA Oceania title

== Professional boxing record ==
17 fights	16 wins	0 losses
By knockout	14	0
By decision	2	0
No contests	1	

No.	Result	Record	Opponent	Type	Round, time	Date	Location	Notes
16	Win	16-0	(India) Karthik Sathish Kumar	UD	10	31 May 2024	Gold Coast Turf Club, Bundall, Queensland, Australia	
15	Win	15-0	(Thailand) Phatiphan Krungklang	TKO	6 (8), 0:43	7 Jul 2023	Town Hall, Malvern, Victoria, Australia	
14	Win	14-0	(Colombia) Andres Garcia	RTD	4 (10), 3:00	2 Jul 2022	USC Soviet Wings, Moscow, Russia	
13	Win	13-0	(Russia) Evgeny Smirnov	TKO	7 (10), 0:32	31 Mar 2022	Basket Hall, Krasnodar, Russia	
12	Win	12-0	(Tanzania) Adam Lazaro	KO	1 (10), 1:26	26 Nov 2021	USC Soviet Wings, Moscow, Russia	
11	Win	11–0	(South Africa) Rofhiwa Maemu	TKO	8 (8), 1:22	15 May 2021	USC Soviet Wings, Moscow, Russia	
10	Win	10–0	(Uzbekistan) Eldorbek Sayidov	RTD	2 (8), 3:00	2 Apr 2021	USC Soviet Wings, Moscow, Russia	
9	Win	9–0	(Venezuela) Otto Gamez	TKO	1 (8), 2:41	20 Feb 2021	Vegas City Hall, Krasnogorsk, Russia	
8	Win	8–0	(Thailand) Krai Setthaphon	RTD	5 (8), 3:00	1 Feb 2020	Yantarny Sports Palace, Kaliningrad, Russia	
7	Win	7–0	(Georgia (country)) Nika Kokashvili	KO	1 (6), 2:55	13 Dec 2019	PAOK Sports Arena, Thessaloniki, Greece	
6	Win	6–0	(Latvia) Antons Zacests	TKO	2 (8)	16 Mar 2019	Hotel W, Barcelona, Cataluña, Spain	
5	Win	5–0	(Russia) Igor Bikulov	TKO	1 (6), 1:22	24 Feb 2019	Central Hall of Boxing, Saint Petersburg, Russia	
4	Win	4–0	(Russia) Ilya Shcherbakov	UD	6	14 Dec 2018	Olimp, Krasnodar, Russia	
3	Win	3–0	(Russia) Andrey Kovalev	KO	1 (6), 2:12	19 Aug 2018	(Russia) Dubai Marina, Dubai, United Arab Emirates	
2	Win	2–0	(Russia) Daniil Chepchigashev	TKO	1 (6), 2:55	9 Jun 2018	Olimp, Krasnodar, Russia	
1	Win	1–0	(Russia) Alexander Saltykov	KO	3 (6), 0:50	7 Sep 2017	Kristall Ice Palace, Saratov, Russia	
